WPI is the abbreviation of:

 Worcester Polytechnic Institute, a private research university in Worcester, Massachusetts, USA.
 Short use of DWPI (Derwent World Patents Index)
 Whey protein isolate, a dietary supplement created by filtering milk protein
 Whittemore Peterson Institute, performs research into chronic fatigue syndrome 
 Wholesale price index, the price of a representative basket of wholesale goods
 Work Personality Index
 Worker-Communist Party of Iran, a political party
 Wraps per inch, a measure of thickness of yarn